Erik Kristiansen (born 12 March 1961 in Furnes, Norway) is a former Norwegian ice hockey player.

Playing career
He played 20 seasons with the Storhamar Dragons of Hamar, Norway. He also played 97 games for Norway's National team (IIHF World Championship and Winter Olympics). He was named the best Norwegian player in 1985, earning him the Golden Puck award.

During the 1987/88 season he was with Björklöven in the Swedish Elitserien where he reached the finals, losing to Färjestad.

He is Storhamar's all-time leading scorer with 509 goals and 406 assists in 649 games over 20 seasons.

External links

 Storhamar Dragons alumni profile (in Norwegian)

1961 births
Living people
Ice hockey players at the 1984 Winter Olympics
Ice hockey players at the 1988 Winter Olympics
Ice hockey players at the 1992 Winter Olympics
Ice hockey players at the 1994 Winter Olympics
IF Björklöven players
NIHF Golden Puck winners
Norwegian expatriate ice hockey people
Norwegian ice hockey centres
Olympic ice hockey players of Norway
Sportspeople from Hamar
Storhamar Dragons players
People from Furnes, Norway